Chomatodus (from  , 'mound' and   'tooth') is a prehistoric cartilaginous fish genus.

Species 
†Chomatodus affinis Newberry & Worthen, 1866 
†Chomatodus angulatus Newberry & Worthen, 1866 
†Chomatodus angustus Newberry, 1879 
†Chomatodus arcuatus St. John, 1870 
†Chomatodus chesterensis St. John & Worthen, 1875 
†Chomatodus comptus St. John & Worthen, 1875 
†Chomatodus costatus Newberry & Worthen, 1866 
†Chomatodus cultellus Anonymous author(s)
†Chomatodus davisi Woodward, 1889
†Chomatodus dentatus Anonymous author(s)
†Chomatodus elegans Newberry & Worthen, 1866 Remains have been found in Keokuk Limestone, Keokuk, Iowa, United States.
†Chomatodus gracillimus Newberry & Worthen, 1866 
†Chomatodus inconstans St. John & Worthen, 1875 
†Chomatodus incrassatus Anonymous author(s)
†Chomatodus insignis Leidy, 1857
†Chomatodus lamelliformis Davis, 1884 
†Chomatodus lanesvillensis Anonymous author(s)
†Chomatodus linearis Agassiz, 1843 
†Chomatodus loriformis Anonymous author(s)
†Chomatodus molaris Newberry & Worthen, 1866  
†Chomatodus newberryi Anonymous author(s)
†Chomatodus parallelus Anonymous author(s)
†Chomatodus piasaensis Anonymous author(s)
†Chomatodus ponticulus Anonymous author(s)
†Chomatodus pusillus Newberry & Worthen, 1866  
†Chomatodus selliformis Anonymous author(s)
†Chomatodus varsouviensis Anonymous author(s)

See also 
 List of prehistoric cartilaginous fish genera

References

External links 

Prehistoric cartilaginous fish genera
Petalodontiformes
Fossil taxa described in 1838
Taxa named by Louis Agassiz